Unbranded is a 2015 American documentary film directed by Phillip Baribeau. It follows four Texas A&M graduates setting out to ride sixteen mustangs from Mexico to Canada in order to raise awareness about issues surrounding wild horses and their management by the United States Bureau of Land Management.

External links
 

2015 films
2010s English-language films